It's Impossible is Perry Como's 19th 12" long-play album released by RCA Records.

After the surprise chart success of the single It's Impossible, this album was quickly recorded in order to issue an LP featuring the hit song. These selections primarily focus on contemporary pop/rock ballads of 1969-1970 first recorded by top chart artists such as The Beatles,  Simon and Garfunkel, The Carpenters, B. J. Thomas, Anne Murray and The Partridge Family.

Track listing

Side one
"It's Impossible" (Music by Armando Manzanero)
"Raindrops Keep Fallin' On My Head" (Music by Burt Bacharach and lyrics by Hal David)
"Something" (Words and Music by George Harrison)
"Snowbird" (Words and Music by Gene MacLellan)
"A House Is Not a Home" (Music by Burt Bacharach and lyrics by Hal David)

Side two
"Everybody Is Looking for an Answer" (Words and Music by Evangeline Seward)
"El Condor Pasa" (Original English lyrics by Paul Simon)
"(They Long to Be) Close to You" (Music by Burt Bacharach and lyrics by Hal David)
"I Think I Love You" (Words and Music by Tony Romeo)
"We've Only Just Begun" (Words and Music by Paul Williams and Roger Nichols)

References

External links
Perry Como Discography

Perry Como albums
1970 albums
Albums produced by Don Costa
RCA Victor albums